Brig Gen Chris Roux  was a General Officer in the South African Army from the artillery.

Military career 

He joined the South African Defence Force in the early seventies. He was an instructor at the South African Army College, Battery Commander at Sierra Battery of 61 Mechanised Battalion Group, OC 10 Artillery Brigade, OC 4 Artillery Regiment, SSO Doctrine at Army Headquarters, Director of Artillery,  General Officer Commanding Artillery Formation from 1999 to 2001. Director Army Acquisitions at Acquisitions Division. He retired in 2012.

Honours and awards

Medals

Proficiency badges

References 

South African Army generals
South African military officers
Living people
1952 births
Afrikaner people
South African people of Dutch descent
Stellenbosch University alumni
South African military personnel of the Border War